Sarah Pitkowski-Malcor (born 13 November 1975) is a former professional tennis player from France. Her career-high singles ranking is world No. 29, which she achieved on 1 November 1999.

Pitkowski won her only career WTA Tour singles final in Budapest in the spring of 1999, where she beat Cristina Torrens Valero in the final. She was also the runner-up at the WTA tournament in Antwerp in the same year, where she lost to Justine Henin. She has won a total of ten singles titles on the ITF Women's Circuit but never advanced beyond the third round of any Grand Slam event in singles competition. She represented France in the first round of the Fed Cup in 1998 as a rookie, and saved the defending champions from losing to Belgium by defeating Sabine Appelmans 4–6, 6–4, 6–1.

Pitkowski married the French professional tennis player Olivier Malcor, who has served as a coach for Nicolas Mahut, on 7 July 2001. The couple have a son.

WTA career finals

Singles: 2 (1 title, 1 runner-up)

Grand Slam singles performance timeline

ITF Circuit finals

Singles: 14 (10–4)

Doubles: 2 (1–1)

External links
 
 
 

1975 births
Living people
People from Seclin
French people of Polish descent
French female tennis players
Sportspeople from Nord (French department)